Bloom Energy is a public company headquartered in San Jose, California. It manufactures and markets solid oxide fuel cells that produce electricity on-site. The company was founded in 2001 and came out of stealth mode in 2010. It raised more than $1 billion in venture capital funding before going public in 2018. Its fuel cells are subsidized by government incentive programs for green energy. As of 2020, Bloom had installed about 600 megawatts worth of fuel cells.

Corporate history

Bloom Energy was founded in 2001 under the name Ion America before being renamed Bloom Energy in 2006. The company worked in secret for 8 years before coming out of stealth mode in 2010. According to the San Francisco Chronicle, that year Bloom had "a coming-out party packed with politicians and Silicon Valley elite." The company was featured on 60 Minutes and supported by political figures. At that time, Bloom had raised $400 million in funding and had 300 employees.

Bloom Energy traces its roots to work performed by KR Sridhar in connection with creating a technology to convert Martian atmospheric gases to oxygen for propulsion and life support. Sridhar and his team built an electrochemical cell for NASA capable of producing air and fuel from electricity generated by a solar panel.

In 2011, Bloom was valued at $2.9 billion. Initially, the company produced about one fuel cell appliance per day before opening a factory in Newark, Delaware in April 2012. By 2013, it raised $1.1 billion in funding, which was followed by additional funding rounds in 2014 and 2015.

Bloom's revenues grew rapidly but it was unprofitable, in some years losing more than $200 million. In 2011, Bloom started selling the electricity produced by its units, rather than the units themselves, fronting the costs of manufacturing the fuel cells. A federal subsidy for fuel cells expired in 2016 and the California Self-Generation Incentive Program was discontinued the following year as the state focused its subsidies on batteries.

Federal subsidies were re-instated in 2018. Bloom filed an initial public offering that July, stating that it did not expect to be profitable in the near-term and disclosing a legal settlement with some of its investors. Later that year, Bloom moved headquarters to San Jose.

In the first two years since its IPO, Bloom shares lost nearly 50% of their value; the company has not been profitable in its first 19 years of operation and had raised over $1.7 billion in capital.

In July 2019, Duke Energy corporation announced the intention of acquiring a portfolio of distributed fuel cell technology projects from Bloom Energy.

Products and services

Bloom Energy produces solid oxide fuel cell power generators called Bloom Energy Servers that use natural gas or biogas as fuel.  According to The New York Times, solid oxide fuel cells are "considered the most efficient but most technologically challenging fuel-cell technology." Instead of precious metals, Bloom Energy's fuel cells use wafers made from sand that are stained with proprietary ink. As fuel passes over the sand wafers, it mixes with oxygen, creating a chemical reaction that produces electricity. The chemical reaction takes place at about 800 degrees Celsius (1,500 degrees Fahrenheit).

Bloom sells the power from the units for 5-15% less than buying power from the grid, rather than selling the units themselves. The generators are normally used for large buildings, manufacturing facilities, or data centers to produce power on-site.

The fuel cells are housed in metal cabinets. Each one produces about 200 to 300 kilowatts of electricity. As of 2018, Bloom had installed about 300 megawatts of units. Data from the state of Delaware found that Bloom's fuel cells produce about 823 pounds of carbon dioxide per megawatt hour. This is less than the ~1,000 pounds  produced when power is taken from the electrical grid, but more than the 777 Bloom used to advertise without taking into consideration the declining efficiency of the appliances with age.

Cost comparison
 electricity produced by fuel cells costs about $0.15 per kilowatt-hour.  In comparison, coal-generated power costs $0.07–$0.15, and natural-gas power costs $0.06–$0.09.

See also
 Bloom Energy Server

References

External links

 
 

Fuel cell manufacturers
Manufacturing companies based in San Jose, California
Renewable energy companies of the United States
Energy companies established in 2001
Renewable resource companies established in 2001
American companies established in 2001
2001 establishments in California
Companies listed on the New York Stock Exchange
2018 initial public offerings